The 1984 British Grand Prix (formally the XXXVII John Player British Grand Prix) was a Formula One motor race held at Brands Hatch, Kent, England on 22 July 1984. It was the tenth race of the 1984 Formula One World Championship.

The 71-lap race was won by Austrian Niki Lauda, driving a McLaren-TAG, with local driver Derek Warwick second in a Renault and Brazilian Ayrton Senna third in a Toleman-Hart. Lauda's teammate Alain Prost retired shortly after half distance with a gearbox failure, enabling Lauda to reduce the Frenchman's lead in the Drivers' Championship to 1.5 points.

Report

Background
Going into the race, McLaren driver Alain Prost led the Drivers' Championship with 34.5 points. Teammate Niki Lauda was second on 24, closely followed by Lotus's Elio de Angelis on 23.5, Ferrari's René Arnoux on 22.5, Williams' Keke Rosberg on 20 and Brabham's Nelson Piquet on 18. McLaren led the Constructors' Championship with 58.5 points, comfortably ahead of Ferrari on 31.5, Lotus on 29.5, Williams on 24 and Brabham on 21.

Prior to the event, the FIA announced that the Tyrrell team would be disqualified from the World Championship for the illegal use of fuel and ballast on their cars. The ruling resulted in Tyrrell losing the 13 points they had scored in the first nine races of the season. Tyrrell owner Ken Tyrrell was granted a High Court order to allow their cars to compete in the Friday Qualifying session. As a result of his crash in the previous race at Dallas in which he broke both of his ankles, Martin Brundle was replaced in the No. 4 Tyrrell by Swedish driver Stefan Johansson.

Qualifying
Johnny Cecotto broke both legs after a heavy crash during first practice. He would never race in Formula One again. Nelson Piquet claimed pole position. Niki Lauda's win for McLaren saw him become the highest point scorer in Formula One history, passing Jackie Stewart's 360.

Renault driver Derek Warwick gave the British fans something to cheer when he finished 42 seconds behind Lauda in second place, while Cecotto's Toleman teammate Ayrton Senna finished 21 seconds behind Warwick in third. Lotus-Renault driver Elio de Angelis kept his championship hopes alive finishing a lap down in fourth place. He was followed by the two Ferraris of Michele Alboreto and René Arnoux in the final points positions.

Lauda's win saw him move to 33 points and with Prost failing to finish his championship lead was cut to just 1.5 points. With 67.5 points, McLaren had scored almost double the amount of Constructors' points than second placed Ferrari who were on 34.5 points.

Eddie Cheever (Alfa Romeo), Philippe Alliot (RAM) and Jo Gartner (Osella) were all outed in a first lap crash which started when Riccardo Patrese lost his Alfa going into the Graham Hill Bend. The race was stopped after 11 laps to clear Jonathan Palmer's RAM.

Classification

Qualifying

Race

Championship standings after the race

Drivers' Championship standings

Constructors' Championship standings

Note: Only the top five positions are included for both sets of standings. Points accurate at final declaration of results. Tyrrell's points were subsequently reallocated.

References

British Grand Prix
British Grand Prix
Grand Prix
British Grand Prix